Regina Safirsztajn (1915-1945) was a Jewish resistance fighter in the Auschwitz underground and one of four women hanged in the Auschwitz concentration camp for her role in the Sonderkommando revolt of 7 October 1944.

Life

Family 
Regina was born in 1915 in Bedzin, Poland to Josef and Roza Safirsztajn. Her father ran a restaurant and bar in the front of their home. 

Regina was the seventh of eight children. Her siblings were Chana Gitla, Mordechai, Isaak, Ezel, Toniam, Cesia, and David. The children attended Polish schools and spoke Yiddish at home.

Bedzin ghetto 
Regina and her family, with the exception of Mordechai who had immigrated to the United States, were forced into in Bedzin ghetto where her Regina's father died of a heart attack. Her mother had died prior to the family's time in the ghetto.

While in the ghetto, Regina married Josef Szaintal who died soon after they wed.

Auschwitz Uprising 
In August 1943, Regina, her sister, sisters-in-law and their children were deported to Auschwitz where the family was separated. Most family members were killed immediately and a few were selected for forced work duty. Regina was sentenced to work in the Weichsel-Union-Metalwerke or Union Munitions Plant where she served a forewoman of the gunpowder room.

Regina joined the resistance while working in the munitions plant. She, along with other prisoners including Ala Gertner, sisters Esterka (Ester) and Anna Wajcblum, and Rose Grunapfel Meth smuggled gunpowder out of the factory and gave it to resistance fighter, Roza Robota. Roza, a prisoner who worked clothing-detail in Birkenau, then gave the gunpowder to the Sonderkommando, a group of death camp prisoners who were forced to dispose of gas chamber victims in the crematoriums. 

On 7 October 1944 the Sonderkommandos used gunpowder to blow up crematorium IV in Birkenau. Ala, Roza, Ester, and Regina were detained and tortured for their role in the plot. The women were publicly hanged in Birkenau on 5 January 1945.

Regina's brother Mordechai, who had immigrated to the United States, and her niece, Rose Rechnic (Roza Ickowicz), were Regina's only family members to survive The Holocaust.

References

External links 

 Portrait of Regina Szafirsztajn, United States Holocaust Museum
 Oral history interview with Anna Wajcblum Heilman, member of the resistance, revolt participant, and Holocaust survivor

Polish people who died in Auschwitz concentration camp
Polish people of World War II
Polish women in World War II resistance
People from Będzin
1915 births
1945 deaths
Będzin Ghetto inmates
Jewish resistance members during the Holocaust
Polish Jews who died in the Holocaust
People executed by Nazi Germany by hanging
Polish people executed in Nazi concentration camps
Jewish anti-fascists
Polish anti-fascists
Jewish women activists